Cole Cold is a line of soft drinks produced by S. M. Jaleel and Company in Trinidad and Tobago.  It is available in banana, diet banana, pear, pineapple, ginger beer, grape, kola champagne, diet kola champagne, orange, diet orange, cream soda, green crush and club soda flavors.

Information
The Cole Cold line was launched in 1981 to replace the company's traditional Red Spot brand. In 18 months following the launch, S. M. Jaleel's market share grew from 1% to 30%. In some areas of the Caribbean, the company S.M. Jaleel is actually called Cole Cold rather than the brand name. This proves the close association that this brand has with the consumers. It is mainly known for its 2L and 20oz packages. It is the leading flavored carbonated soft drink beverage in Trinidad. The brand has been successful in the market since the early 1980s. Pear D is one of the Cole cold flavors that is known to be the premium beverage and today it still continues to be one of the most popular flavors. Pear D is also now available in cans.  The name Jaliter had been given to the brand because it is a combination of the company name and the name of a one-litre package. Since that name had been given to it, the 2L package had also inherited this name as well as the other competitor 2L package.

References

External links
 Cole Cold on the S. M. Jaleel corporate website

Cola brands
Soft drinks
Products introduced in 1981